Pope Gabriel III of Alexandria, 78th Pope of Alexandria and Patriarch of the See of St. Mark.

He was originally one of the candidates for the Papal post when Pope John VII was elected. With support from some of the Bishops, Gabriel III replaced John VII and reigned for three years until his death, when John VII was reinstated. This is the only occasion in history when the Coptic Orthodox Church had two Popes at the same time.

References

13th-century Coptic Orthodox popes of Alexandria
1271 deaths